Guillermo Calderón is a Chilean playwright, director, and screenwriter. His plays have been produced at The Public Theater, Royal Court Theatre, and around the world.

Biography 
Calderón was born in Santiago, Chile in 1971. Growing up in Chile he studied acting at the Theater School of the University of Chile.   Calderón also attended the Dell'Arte International School of Physical Theater in California, and receiving a master's degree in Film Theory at the City University of New York.

Career 
Calderón's plays include: B, Clase, Diciembre, Escuela, Gold Rush, Kiss, Mateluna, Neva, Quake, Speech, and Villa.

References 
Guillermo Calderón's profile on the World Theatre Map.

1971 births
Living people
Chilean screenwriters
Writers from Santiago
Chilean theatre directors
Male screenwriters
Chilean male dramatists and playwrights
21st-century screenwriters
21st-century Chilean dramatists and playwrights
21st-century Chilean male writers
University of Chile alumni
City University of New York alumni